Acleris maximana is a species of moth of the family Tortricidae first described by William Barnes and August Busck in 1920. It is found in North America, where it has been recorded from Alberta, British Columbia, California, Maryland, Massachusetts, Montana, New Brunswick, North Carolina, Ontario, Pennsylvania, Saskatchewan, Tennessee, Utah and Washington.

The wingspan is 21–28 mm. The forewings are blue grey, variably mottled and suffused with smoky shades, as well as with very fine, broken dark lines on the vein. Adults have been recorded on wing nearly year round.

The larvae feed on Prunus emarginata, Salix, Malus (including Malus pumila) and Populus species (including Populus balsamifera, Populus tremula and Populus tremuloides).

References

Moths described in 1920
maximana
Moths of North America